Stefan Larsson is the name of:

 Stefan Larsson (businessman) (born 1974), American fashion industry executive
 Stefan Larsson (footballer) (born 1983), Swedish retired footballer
 Stefan Larsson (ice hockey) (born 1965), Swedish retired ice hockey player